Mount Rainbow is a peak, 2,050 m, along the south side of Byrd Glacier, surmounting the broad ridge between Zeller and Sefton Glaciers. So named by the New Zealand Geological Survey Antarctic Expedition (NZGSAE) (1960–61) as the peak consists of multi-colored beds of sandstone with probable dolerite sitting on pink-green limestone.

Mountains of Oates Land